Samir Sammoun (born August 10, 1952) is a Canadian–Lebanese artist and telecommunications engineer.

Early life 
Samir Sammoun was raised in Joun, Lebanon on his family's 1,000-year-old olive plantation. His father, Fares Sammoun, was a broker at the Port of Beirut, and an olive grove farmer. His father Fares and mother Marie Bouchrouch, were married for 65 years until their deaths in 2008 and 2010.  Born into one of Joun's notable families, Samir is the third child in a family of six children; five boys and one girl.  In 1976, his brother Elias, (age 20), was killed in the Lebanese civil war.

Samir Sammoun began painting in oils at the age of 13, while continuing his formal education. After completing studies at the Ecole des Arts et Metiers in Beirut in 1969, he emigrated to Montreal, Quebec, Canada in 1973 at the age of 21.   There he obtained a Baccalauriat en Ingenierie (Engineering degree) in Electronics in 1977, followed by a master's degree in telecommunications from the Ecole Polytechnique de Montreal in 1978. After becoming a citizen of Canada in 1976, it was there he met and married Yvette Charron in 1980.

Work and careers 

While pursuing a career as a telecommunications engineer, and obtaining several patents for Cable TV transmission systems, Sammoun resumed painting oils on canvas, and simultaneously launched a second career as a professional artist.

In 1988–92 Samir Sammoun obtained three patents for engineering inventions that would enable Cable providers to broadcast and receive high speed data over Cable Networks.  From 1990–95 Sammoun served as Vice President of Videotron in Montreal, after which he founded his own company SHS Technology. SHS was a leading analyst in the technology that operates the Broadband over power line, which transmits internet signals to and from subscribers of electricity companies. While at Videotron he and his colleagues, as described in their 1990 patent, invented a "cable communication system comprising a bidirectional transmission network connected to the head end for transmitting signals downstream from the head end to a plurality of subscriber stations, and for transmitting data signals upstream to the Cable provider".  Along with others, this system forms the basic technology for addressing data traveling over the internet.

In 2003–2004 he was the featured artist in a televised segment on Mountain Lake PBS Television, Plattsburgh, New York.  His work is cataloged in the National Library of Canada.

In 2003 Samir Sammoun was the invited guest of Emile J. Lahoud, President of Lebanon. His visit was featured in a segment on LBC-TV; and his painting Olive Grove was installed in the Baabda Palace, Presidential Palace in Beirut.

A solo exhibition of his paintings was held at the Gallery d 'Art at the Musee des Beaux-arts de Montreal from October–December 2005, attended by Quebec Premier Jean Charest and his wife Michelle Dionne. Prior to that, Samir Sammoun was given a retrospective at the Musee de Marc-Aurele Fortin in the old city of Montreal, Quebec, Canada.

In 2009 he exhibited at the Plattsburgh State University Art Museum, Plattsburgh, New York to create a series of 18 oil paintings commemorating the 400th Anniversary of the European discovery of Lake Champlain. The paintings were exhibited there from May – July 2009, and featured in a live broadcast there on Fox TV; after which two were exhibited for a year at the Governor's mansion in Albany, upon the request of the First Lady of New York, Michelle Paige Paterson. Paintings from this group were also entered into the Plattsburgh State University Art Museum, and the Samuel de Champlain Museum's permanent collections.

Three of his paintings were acquired in 2011 by the Arab Fund for Economic and Social Development (AFESD) Museum of Kuwait, for their permanent collection.
Other Museum credits include a Group Exhibition at the McCord Museum in Montreal Feb–March 2002, a Guest Artist Exhibition at the Latino Art Museum in Pomona, California 2008 and a commission he painted in 1997 for the St. Joseph's Oratory, a National Historic Landmark in Montreal that receives 2.5 million visitors every year. Another painting was commissioned by Corporate Affairs International and donated to the government of Quebec. It is now included in the permanent collection of the Quebec government offices in Quebec City.

Works 

Sammoun works in a series of images from one palette. He works with oils on jute and linen canvas, applying a heavy impasto, created in fast emotional bursts of energy.  The result is a spontaneous rendering of the subject, as if a flickering effect of light is coming through, reflected by the colors he places side by side and on top of one another on his canvas. Critics like Noel Meyer of MAGAZIN' ART have said, "Sammoun attempts to make his audience feel the wind blow through the trees, the heat in the air and the colours of the sky ..."  Victor Forbes Editor of Fine Art Magazine, has said that "Sammoun's emotional investment in each work is evident in every canvas."

Paintings by Sammoun were in a 2012 group exhibition "Viewpoint and Vistas".

Personal life 

With his siblings in Lebanon, he is today the owner of an olive grove near his birthplace in Joun that produces extra virgin olive oils.

 Samir Sammoun is active in several charitable organizations, including Sainte Justine Hospital of Montreal and the Medical Mission for Children in Boston.  In 2012 Sammoun met with Cardinal Bechara Boutros Al Rahi, Patriarch of the Maronite Catholic Church, during his visit to Montreal; and presented him with an oil painting to be placed in the Bkerke, at the historic coastal city of Junieh, Lebanon.

Museum exhibitions 

 Boston Museum of Fine Arts, "Give the Arts a Chance" project 2014, 2012, 2011
 Plattsburgh State University Art Museum, Plattsburgh, New York, 2009
 Latino Art Museum, Pomona, California, 2008
 Montreal Museum of Fine Arts, Art Gallery, Quebec Nov–Dec 2005
 Retrospective at the Marc-Aurèle Fortin Museum, Montreal, November 2003 to January 2004
 McCord Museum, Montréal, Group Exhibition 2002
 Permanent collection of the Latino Art Museum, Pomona, California
 Permanent collection of the Plattsburgh State University Art Museum, Plattsburgh, New York
 Permanent collection of the Champlain Museum, Lake Champlain, New York
 Permanent Collection St. Joseph's Oratory Museum, Montréal, Québec, Canada
 Permanent collection of Arab Fund for Economic and Social Development Museum, Kuwait

Publications 

 Boston Museum of Fine Arts "Give the Arts a Chance" Catalog 2011, 2012
 Fine Art Magazine, Samir Sammoun in Montreal, Channeling Van Gogh, Victor Forbes, Winter 2006
 Musée des beaux-arts de Montreal – Galerie d'art Catalog.  Foreword by Michelle Dionne, First Lady of Quebec. 2005
 Fine Art Magazine, Samir Sammoun Fields of Faith, Groves of Gratitude, Victor Forbes, Spring 2004
 Fine Art Magazine, Samir Sammoun Walking with Giants, Victor Forbes, Spring 2003
 Musèe Marc-Auréle Fortin Museum Catalog "Sammoun au Musée Marc-Auréle Fortin" 2003
 MAGAZINART, October 2000 : Samir Sammoun, Artiste Peintre de Grande Classe
 Samir Sammoun, Artiste Peintre de classe internationale, Pierre H. Savignac, 1996
 National Library of Canada, 1993
 Bibliothèque Nationale du Québec, 1992

Solo exhibitions 
 Galerie d'Orsay, Boston, Massachusetts, 2012, 2011, 2010, 2009, 2007, 2006, 2005
 Onessimo Fine Art February 2013.
 Douglas Albert Gallery, State College, Pennsylvania, 2009
 Chasen Galleries, Richmond, Virginia, 2009, 2005, 2004, 2003, 2002,
 Latino Art Museum, Pomona, California, 2008
 J.R. Mooney Galleries, San Antonio, Texas, 2007, 2004
 Exhibition, Gallery d'art of the Montreal Museum of Fine Arts, 2007
 Artagraphix, Westlake Village, California 2005, 2002
 Retrospective One-Man Exhibition at the Marc-Aurèle Fortin Museum, Montréal, 2003 to 2004
 Salon des Galeries d'Art, Montréal, 2000
 Gallery Klimantiris, Montréal, Québec, 1997
 Salon des Galeries d'Art, Place Bonaventure, Montréal, Québec, 1995
 Gallery Centre d'Art Monrency, Montréal, Québec, 1994

Group exhibitions 
 Palm Beach Jewelry, Art & Antique Show, February 2013.
 Art Expo, New York, 2013, 2012, 2011, 2010, 2009, 2008, 2007, 2006, 2005, 2004, 2003, 2002, 2001, 2000, 1999, 1998, 1997, 1996.
 Galerie d'Orsay "View Points & Vistas" 2012
 Art Expo Miami, 2013
 Le Balcon D'Art, Montreal, Quebec, 2012
 Off the Wall Gallery, Houston, Texas, 2012
 Gallery D'May, Cape May, New Jersey, 2011
 Red Dot Miami, 2011
 Montreal City Hall, June 2005
 Canadian Heritage Art Gallery, 2004
 Palm Springs Expo, Palm Springs, California, 2003
 Plattsburgh State University Art Museum, 2002
 McCord Museum, Montréal, 2002
 Decor Expo, Atlanta, Georgia, 2002
 Collectors Editions, New York Art Expo, 2002, 2001
 Caza, Longueuil, Québec, 1999
 Galeries Ozias Leduc, Montréal, 1998
 CAPI, Venice, Italy, 1993
 CAPSQ, Dorval, Québec, 1992

Corporate and public collections 

 Government of Quebec, Offices of the Premier  : Quebec City, Québec
 Baabda Palace, Presidential Palace: Beirut, Lebanon
 City of Plattsburgh, New York: Office of the Mayor
 St-Joseph Oratory Museum: Montréal, Québec
 Vidéotron :  Canada
 Ayerst Laboratories :  Montréal, Québec
 Metropolitan Orchestra:  Montréal, Québec
 Novartis Pharma Canada Inc. : Montréal, Québec
 Swaby Ogilvy, Renault : Montréal, Québec
 Bkerke, Maronite Catholic Patriarchate, Junieh, Lebanon
 Delta Hotel : Montréal, Québec
 IBM Corporation : Montréal, Québec
 Coca-Cola Corporation : HQ, San Antonio, Texas
 Arab Fund for Economic & Social Development(AFESD)
 DataPoint Capital, Boston, Massachusetts
Also in private collections in the United States, Canada, Mexico, France, and England.

References

External links 

 Press Republican.com
 SUNY Plattsburgh news
 Samir Sammoun Official Website 
 Plattsburgh State Art Museum "Views of Lake Champlain"  Samir Sammoun
 Gallerie d'Orsay Group Exhibition Viewpoints & Vistas – Pissarro, Rembrandt, Whistler, Sammoun

1952 births
Living people
Canadian people of Lebanese descent
20th-century Canadian painters
Canadian male painters
21st-century Canadian painters
Canadian inventors
Canadian Impressionist painters
Artists from Montreal
Canadian telecommunications engineers
Canadian landscape painters
Lebanese painters
Lebanese inventors
Lebanese engineers
Canadian contemporary painters
Lebanese contemporary artists
20th-century Canadian male artists
21st-century Canadian male artists